Alexei Vladimirovich Glukhov (born April 5, 1984) is a Russian former professional ice hockey forward who last played under contract with HC Sibir Novosibirsk of the Kontinental Hockey League (KHL). He was selected by Tampa Bay Lightning in the 9th round (286th overall) of the 2002 NHL Entry Draft.

Career statistics

External links

1984 births
Atlant Moscow Oblast players
Avangard Omsk players
HC Khimik Voskresensk players
Living people
Russian ice hockey left wingers
Salavat Yulaev Ufa players
Severstal Cherepovets players
HC Sibir Novosibirsk players
Springfield Falcons players
Tampa Bay Lightning draft picks
Victoria Salmon Kings players
People from Voskresensk
Sportspeople from Moscow Oblast